Cambodia–Russia relations are the bilateral relations of Cambodia and Russia. The relations between both countries were strong since the Soviet era. Russia has an embassy in Phnom Penh. Cambodia has an embassy in Moscow. Both countries are full members of the East Asia Summit.

Present day Cambodia and Russia relations
After the collapse of the Soviet Union, the relationships between the two countries were completely strained under Boris Yeltsin. However, as Vladimir Putin rose to power, they were improved as the two countries became members of the East Asia Summit, which helped the two countries improve their trade.

Relations between the two began to sour once more in March 2022 after Hun Sen condemned Russia for invading its neighbor, Ukraine and the country voted in favor of an UN resolution. Cambodia had similarly been occupied by Vietnam, an ally of the Soviet Union, from 1979 to 1989.

See also

Foreign relations of Cambodia
Foreign relations of Russia
List of ambassadors of Russia to Cambodia
People's Republic of Kampuchea

References

External links
 Russia and the other Asian states
 Russian embassy in Phnom Penh 

 
Russia
Bilateral relations of Russia